Acacia obtusata, commonly known as blunt-leaf wattle or obtuse wattle, is a tree or shrub belonging to the genus Acacia and the subgenus Phyllodineae native to eastern Australia.

Description
Like many species of Acacia it has phyllodes rather than true leaves. The evergreen phyllodes have an oblanceolate or sometimes narrowly elliptic shape and are straight to shallowly incurved. It blooms from August to October and produces inflorescences that appear in group of 5 to 14. The spherical flower-heads contain 15 to 27 sub-densely packed golden coloured flowers.

Taxonomy
The specific epithet is in reference to the obtuse shape of the phyllodes.

Distribution
It is endemic to New South Wales from around the Budawang Range in the north down to near Mount Coricudgy where it is found scattered on tablelands growing in sandy soils as a part of dry sclerophyll forest communities. It is common in the western Blue Mountains from around Braidwood to Tumut.

See also
 List of Acacia species

References

obtusata
Flora of New South Wales